Slobodinskaya is a rural locality (a village) in Tarnogskoye Rural Settlement, Tarnogsky District, Vologda Oblast, Russia. The population was 47 as of 2002.

Geography 
Slobodinskaya is located 28 km northeast of Tarnogsky Gorodok (the district's administrative centre) by road. Silivanovskaya is the nearest rural locality.

References 

Rural localities in Tarnogsky District